Scarlet Sails is a 1961 Soviet film produced by Mosfilm and directed by Alexandr Ptushko.  It is based on Alexander Grin's 1923 adventure novel of the same name and stars Vasily Lanovoy and Anastasiya Vertinskaya.  The story is a romantic fantasy and is described as a "fairy tale", though it contains no overtly supernatural elements.

Plot
The setting is a small fishing village. The former seaman Longren raises his daughter Assol alone after losing his beloved wife, making a meager living by selling the toy boats he carves from wood.  As a child, Assol encounters an old man who claims to be a wizard and promises the girl that one day a prince will come on a ship with scarlet sails to carry her away.  The villagers scoff but Assol believes her dream will come true one day.

Arthur Grey is a nobleman's son who breaks away from his cruel father to pursue a life at sea, and eventually becomes the captain of a merchant vessel.  Having set to port at Assol's village, he spies the young maiden sleeping in the forest and falls in love.  After inquiring in the village he learns of Assol's dream and sets about to make it come true.

Principal cast

Miscellaneous
This was the film debut of Anastasiya Vertinskaya, who celebrated her 16th birthday during the filming. She went on to star in such Soviet classics as The Amphibian Man and Hamlet.

Locations used in the filming include Koktebel and Yalta in Crimea, Baku in Azerbaijan, and Pitsunda in Abkhazia.

Grey's ship Secret was actually the training ship Alfa from the Rostov Naval School.  It was outfitted with 2,500 meters of scarlet parachute silk procured to satisfy Ptushko's demand for authenticity.

Notes

References
Alexandr Ptushko (Director). Scarlet Sails [DVD]. (IV quarter 2003). Russia: RUSCICO

External links

Original Russian text of the novel at Maksim Moshkow's Library
English translation of the novel

1961 films
Soviet fantasy drama films
Mosfilm films
1960s Russian-language films
Films directed by Aleksandr Ptushko
Films shot in Crimea